Aziz Nasirzadeh (born 1965) is an Islamic Republic of Iran Army Brigadier General and Deputy of Chief of Staff for the Armed Forces of the Islamic Republic of Iran since September 2021. He was the commander of the Iranian Air Force from August 2018 to September 2021. He previously served as Chief of Staff of the Iranian Air Force. He is a veteran of the Iran-Iraq War and also a certified F-14 pilot.

References 

Living people
Islamic Republic of Iran Army brigadier generals
Commanders of Islamic Republic of Iran Air Force
Islamic Republic of Iran Army personnel of the Iran–Iraq War
1965 births
People from Sarab, East Azerbaijan